The Commercial Hotel is located in Prairie du Chien, Wisconsin.

History
Originally known as the Schweizer Block, this Italianate-styled building first housed retail, offices and storage.  It later became the Commodore Hotel, the Commercial Hotel, and the Fort Crawford Hotel. The building was added to the State and the National Register of Historic Places in 2002.

References

Hotel buildings on the National Register of Historic Places in Wisconsin
Office buildings on the National Register of Historic Places in Wisconsin
National Register of Historic Places in Crawford County, Wisconsin
Italianate architecture in Wisconsin